This article lists events from the year 2010 in France.

Incumbents
 President – Nicolas Sarkozy
 Prime Minister – François Fillon

Events

January
 10 January – Referendum in Martinique and French Guiana.

February
 12 to 28 February – During Olympic Games in Vancouver, the French team wins 11 medals:
Gold medals
Vincent Jay
Jason Lamy-Chappuis
Silver medals
Déborah Anthonioz
Martin Fourcade
biathlon women team (Marie-Laure Brunet, Sylvie Becaert, Marie Dorin and Sandrine Bailly)
Bronze medals
Marie Dorin
Tony Ramoin
Marie-Laure Brunet
Vincent Jay
Marion Josserand
Mathieu Bozzetto
 28 February – The storm Xynthia kills at least 51 people, with 12 more said to be missing.

March
 14 to 21 March – Regionales elections.
 12 to 21 March: In the 2010 Winter Paralympics France wins 6 medals.

April

May

June
 6 June – The 2010 French Open tennis tournament concludes at Stade Roland Garros, with Rafael Nadal winning the Men's Singles and Francesca Schiavone the Women's.

July
 9 July – Carmaker PSA Peugeot Citroen finalises a venture with Chinese carmaker Changan Automotive, which will see Peugeot and Citroen both buildings cars in China in the near future.
 Tour de France

August
 25 August – The new Renault Latitude is launched at the 2010 Moscow International Motor Show and is due on sale later this year for other markets. The European-spec Latitude will be launched at the 2010 Paris Motor Show.

September
 7 September – The first of the 2010 French pension reform strikes takes place. The strikes, involving workers in both the public and private sectors, continue into October.

October

November
 1 November My Chemical Romance on Tour Cigale
 4 – 13 November 13 – Fencing World Championship in Paris

December

Births

 28 May – Louis, Duke of Burgundy – elder son of Prince Louis, Duke of Anjou
 2 June Princess Ruby Girl

Deaths

 7 January – Philippe Séguin – politician (born 1943)
 10 January – Mano Solo – singer (born 1963)
 11 January – Éric Rohmer – film director (born 1920)
 23 January – Roger Pierre – actor (born 1923)
 31 January – Pierre Vaneck – actor (born 1931)
 3 February – Georges Wilson – actor and theater director (born 1921)
 6 March – Roger Gicquel – television newsreader (born 1933)
 7 March – Patrick Topaloff – singer and actor (born 1944)
 8 March – Guy Lapébie – cyclist (born 1916)
 13 March – Jean Ferrat – singer (born 1930)
 11 April – Jean Boiteux, swimmer (born 1933).
 31 August – Laurent Fignon, cyclist (born 1960)
 12 September – Claude Chabrol, French film director (born 1930)
 27 December – Bernard-Pierre Donnadieu, actor (born 1949)

References

Links

2010s in France